American Don is the fourth studio album by American math rock band Don Caballero, released on Touch and Go in 2000.  It was recorded by Steve Albini. It is the final album to feature bassist Eric Emm and guitarist Ian Williams.

Background 
American Don is Don Caballero's fifth full-length release and fourth proper studio album, but many fans consider it the group's final album due to the falling out between Ian Williams and Damon Che, the group's creative core, after the release of the album.  Che is actually the only original member of Don Caballero to play on this and all subsequent recordings.

The photos of car accidents in the CD booklet proved prophetic, as this lineup of Don Caballero disbanded after being involved in a van accident while touring in support of American Don. Singer/guitarist Fred Weaver was the opening act on this tour and his exhaustive tour diary was published in issue 16 of Chunklet as "The Dark Final Days of Don Caballero".

Track listing

Reception 
Pitchfork rated American Don 7.5 out of 10.

Personnel

Don Caballero 
Damon Che – drums
Ian Williams – guitar
Eric Emm – bass guitar

Technical 
Steve Albini - recording engineer (credited only as "the proprietor" of Electrical Audio Studio A)

References

External links
TGRec.com American Don on Touch and Go Records

Don Caballero albums
2000 albums
albums produced by Steve Albini
Touch and Go Records albums